Napp or NAPP may refer to:

Napp, Norway, a village
Napp Pharmaceuticals, a British pharmaceutical manufacturer
Larry Napp (1916–1993), American baseball umpire

Acronyms
NAPP (database) (Nucleic Acid Phylogenetic Profile Database)
National Association of Patent Practitioners
National Association of Photoshop Professionals
North Atlantic Population Project

See also
Nap (disambiguation)
Nappe (disambiguation)
Gnap (disambiguation)